Jodłówka may refer to the following places:
Jodłówka, Lesser Poland Voivodeship (south Poland)
Jodłówka, Podlaskie Voivodeship (north-east Poland)
Jodłówka, Subcarpathian Voivodeship (south-east Poland)